Jatrabari Ideal High School, is a secondary school located in Jatrabari Thana, Dhaka, Bangladesh.  It was founded in 1998 by MP Alhaz Salauddin Ahammed as a Bangla Medium School.

References

High schools in Bangladesh
1998 establishments in Bangladesh
Educational institutions established in 1998
Schools in Dhaka District